"I Don't Wanna Be a Loser" is a song written by Ben Raleigh and Mark Barkan and performed by Lesley Gore.  It reached #12 on the adult contemporary chart and #37 on the Billboard Hot 100 in 1964.  It was featured on her 1964 album, Boys, Boys, Boys.

Billboard described the song as a "fine teen ballad sung with grace and feeling."  Cash Box described it as "a dramatic beat-ballad hip-swinger that Leslie delivers in her effective teen fashion" with a "tasteful" arrangement by Claus Ogerman.

The song was produced by Quincy Jones and arranged by Claus Ogerman. It was featured in the soundtrack of the 1964 movie The Pawnbroker.

References

1964 songs
1964 singles
Songs with lyrics by Ben Raleigh
Songs written by Mark Barkan
Lesley Gore songs
Song recordings produced by Quincy Jones
Mercury Records singles